Coleophora ancistron is a moth of the family Coleophoridae. It is found in southern Russia, central Asia and Mongolia.

Adults are on wing in May and August.

References

ancistron
Moths described in 1976
Moths of Asia